The Silvers-Dudley Prize is an American literary award established in 2021 and presented by the Robert B. Silvers Foundation. Three prizes are awarded each year: the Robert B. Silvers Prize for Literary Criticism, the Grace Dudley Prize for Arts Writing, and the Robert B. Silvers Prize for Journalism.

Award details 
The Silver-Dudley Prize is named after the late Robert B. Silvers, long-time editor of The New York Review of Books, and his partner, the late Lady Grace Dudley. Prize recipients receive between $10,000 and $30,000.

Daniel Mendelsohn, director of the Robert B. Silvers Foundation, explained the awards, saying, “These prizes richly reward a kind of writing that has long been under-recognized in the economy of literary prize-giving—long-form criticism, the intellectual essay, and arts writing—along with the penetrating journalism that Bob nurtured at the New York Review. In his will, Bob stipulated that the Foundation work to ‘support writers’; with these new prizes, we like to think we’re doing just that.”

Recipients

References 

American literary awards